Cicerale is a town and comune in the province of Salerno in the Campania region of south-western Italy.

Geography
The municipality is located in Cilento and borders with Agropoli, Capaccio-Paestum, Giungano, Monteforte Cilento, Ogliastro Cilento, Perito, Prignano Cilento and Trentinara.

It counts a single hamlet (frazione), Monte Cicerale. Located 2 km far from the town, the village lies at an altitude of 550 m and has a population of 384.

See also
Alento river
Cilentan dialect
Cilento and Vallo di Diano National Park

References

External links

Cities and towns in Campania
Localities of Cilento